The Danbury Whalers were a minor league professional ice hockey team in the Federal Hockey League that began play in the 2010–11 season. Based in Danbury, Connecticut, the Whalers played at the Danbury Ice Arena, located in CityCenter Danbury. Their name comes from the Hartford Whalers, who were a professional ice hockey team based in Connecticut and played in Hartford from 1975 to 1997 before relocating to North Carolina as the Carolina Hurricanes.

Until the 2014–15 season, the Danbury Whalers were an affiliate of the Evansville IceMen of the ECHL.

History
On March 22, 2013, the Whalers won their first FHL Commissioner's Cup Title by sweeping the Dayton Demonz in front of a home standing-room only crowd of 3,116 fans.

On April 3, 2015, the Danbury Ice Arena announced that it did not want to renew its contract with the Danbury Whalers and gave them a notice to evict by April 17, leaving the team homeless. Prior to their eviction, the Whalers led the FHL home attendance for the league's first five seasons.

On June 3, 2015, due to the eviction of the Danbury Whalers, the Federal Hockey League announced a new team based in Brewster, New York, to be called the Stateline Whalers, and would play at the Brewster Ice Arena under former Danbury Whalers CEO and managing partner, Herm Sorcher. The team was announced as being owned by Barry Soskin, who also owns the Port Huron Prowlers, the Danville Dashers, and the former Dayton Demonz. The Danbury Whalers were officially considered to be on hiatus for the season by the FHL, but gave up their naming and territorial rights to Brewster.

On June 27, it was reported that the FHL had approved of a new team in Danbury, Connecticut, to replace the departed Whalers. Local businessmen, Bruce Bennett and Edward Crowe were announced as the ownership group. Bennett would announce the new team as the Danbury Titans and had signed a six-year lease to play at the Danbury Ice Arena.

On July 15, during the team's inaugural booster club meeting, Danbury Titans ownership confirmed that the league had re-organized and they will own the new Brewster team (formerly announced as the Stateline Whalers); Barry Soskin will continue to own the Danville Dashers and Port Huron Prowlers but no longer be involved in Brewster. On July 18, Bennett announced the team would be called the Brewster Bulldogs and would have no connection to  the former Whalers franchise.

Season-by-season record

See also
Professional Hockey In Connecticut

References

External links
News-Times article announcing Whalers' entry

Federal Prospects Hockey League teams
Danbury, Connecticut
Ice hockey teams in Connecticut
Ice hockey clubs established in 2010
Ice hockey clubs disestablished in 2015
Sports in Fairfield County, Connecticut